Vijay Vikram (Kannada: ವಿಜಯ್ ವಿಕ್ರಮ್) is a 1979 Indian Kannada film, directed by V. Somashekhar and produced by A. R. Raju. The film stars Vishnuvardhan, Jayanthi, Deepa and Pramila Joshai in the lead roles. The film has musical score by Chellapilla Satyam.

Plot

Vikram is a landlord who rapes Jayanthi, who is the daughter of his estate manager. Jayanthi gets pregnant and gives birth to a son who grows up to be Vijay. Jayanti uses her son to take revenge on Vikram. Towards the end Vikram learns that Vijay is his own son and regrets his past deeds. But other baddies create problems for the family. Vikram dies in the end.

Cast

Vishnuvardhan as Vikram and Vijay
Jayanthi
Deepa
Pramila Joshai
Ashalatha
B. Jayashree
Vijayalakshmi
Uma
Leelavathi
Baby Rekha
Kamini Bhatiya
Dwarakish
K. S. Ashwath
Chethan Ramarao
Thoogudeepa Srinivas
Shakti Prasad
Prabhakar
Bheemaraj
S. Rajanna
Musuri Krishnamurthy
Hanumanthachar
Comedian Guggu
Thipatur Siddaramaiah
Kunigal Ramanath

References

External links
 

1979 films
1970s Kannada-language films
Films scored by Satyam (composer)